Rebecca Christina Cotton (born 23 August 1974 in Nelson) is a basketball player for New Zealand. She competed at the 2000 and 2004 Summer Olympics for the Tall Ferns New Zealand women's basketball team. At the 2006 Commonwealth Games she was part of the silver medal winning Tall Ferns side.

References

External links
 
 
 
 

1974 births
Living people
New Zealand women's basketball players
Basketball players at the 2006 Commonwealth Games
Commonwealth Games silver medallists for New Zealand
Basketball players at the 2000 Summer Olympics
Basketball players at the 2004 Summer Olympics
Sportspeople from Nelson, New Zealand
Olympic basketball players of New Zealand
Commonwealth Games medallists in basketball
Medallists at the 2006 Commonwealth Games